Ginatilan, officially the Municipality of Ginatilan,  is a 5th class municipality in the province of Cebu, Philippines. According to the 2020 census, it has a population of 16,906 people.

Ginatilan is bordered to the north by the town of Malabuyoc, to the west is the Tañon Strait, to the east is the town of Oslob, and to the south is the town of Samboan.

Geography

Barangays
Ginatilan comprises 14 barangays:

Climate

Demographics

Economy

Attractions

Inambakan Falls is the municipality's most visited natural attraction. Hidden in a river valley in the middle of Ginatilan's highlands, the towering  waterfall can be reached via motorcycles for hire.

Mount Hambubuyog straddles the border of Ginatilan and Samboan. The summit offers views of Tañon Strait and Negros Island.

Local delicacies include palagsing, tinumpi, and kinugay, made from buli tree.

Every March is annual festival in honor of the patron St. Gregory the Great.

Livelihood includes farming, fishing, government, and business.

Ginatilan is the hometown of Catholic martyr and second Filipino saint, St. Pedro Calungsod, who was killed during his missionary work in Guam with Diego Luis de San Vitores in 1672.

References

External links
 [ Philippine Standard Geographic Code]

Municipalities of Cebu